Timimi, At Timimi or Tmimi, is a small village in Libya about 75 km east of Derna and 100 km west of Tobruk. It is on the eastern shores of the Libyan coastline of the Mediterranean Sea.

Geography
Because its underground water is salty, it was always a place of little importance, and its population in 2006 was 4,667. However, its situation improved after the Charruba–Timimi Road was paved between 1975 and 1985; it is now at the crossroads of the Charruba–Timimi Road and the Derna-Tobruk road.

History
The Greek historian Herodotus said that Cyrene was founded in the mid-7th century BC by a group of Greek immigrants from Thera. These settlers under Battus first landed along the Gulf of Bomba (now the Gulf of Timimi) and stayed there for years before moving to Cyrene.

The settlement at Timimi was known in antiquity as Paliurus (Palíouros) after its nearby river, in turn named after the plants growing within its marshes. Its name was changed following its conquest by the early Muslim Caliphate in AD642.

During World War II's African campaign, German general Erwin Rommel and his troops reached Timimi on 3 February 1942, stopping there until 26 May 1942, when Rommel began the Battle of Gazala.

References

Populated places in Derna District